Habib Sadegh is a Tunisian football manager. He managed Al-Gharafa in the Qatar Stars League on 4 occasions.

References

Living people
Tunisian football managers
Al-Gharafa SC managers
Year of birth missing (living people)
Tunisian expatriate football managers
Qatar Stars League managers
Expatriate football managers in Qatar
Tunisian expatriate sportspeople in Qatar